The Universal Muslim Association of America (UMAA) is a non-governmental organization that works on social, political, religious, and humanitarian issues. UMAA has held annual conventions since 2003 in Washington, D.C., and Toronto, Canada.  UMAA is a Shia Muslim organization, yet has established notable relationships with other sects of Islam.

History
The first convention held by UMAA was in Washington, D.C., in May 2003, and was attended by approximately 3,000 individuals of the Shia Muslim community. Subsequently the convention was held annually on Memorial Day weekend in Washington, D.C., until 2011, wherein it was held in Toronto, Canada. In 2013, the convention was scheduled to be held in Dearborn, Michigan.

Mission statement
According to the UMAA website, the mission statement of the organization is as follows:

Objectives
 Organize conventions, seminars, and workshops to help achieve the goals of UMAA.
 Cooperate and coordinate with other organizations pursuing similar political and other goals.
 Publish magazines, websites, newsletters, brochures, and other written materials.
 Encourage civic participation in domestic and international issues relevant to all Muslims.

Conference of Ali
In 2013, the convention was renamed "The Conference of Ali" to emphasize its new style, location, and differences political viewpoints from previous years.

External links
 Official website

Political advocacy groups in the United States
Religious activism
Islamic organizations based in the United States
Organizations established in 2002
2002 establishments in the United States